Antifascist Front of Slavs in Hungary (Serbo-Croatian: Antifašistički front Slovena u Mađarskoj/Антифашистички фронт Словена у Мађарској, Hungarian: Magyarországi Szlávok Antifasiszta Frontja) was organization founded on February 18, 1945, in Battonya. For General Secretary was elected Dragutin Nedučić from Battonya and for vice-president Stevan Nedučić from Csanádpalota.

After ending military administration first in March local organization of AFSH were founded in Bács among Bunjevci and among Šokci in Hercegszántó. Main organizer among Bunjevci was Antun Karagić.

After Békés and Bács new organizations were founded around Budapest. In August County Secretariat of AFSH was founded in Pécs and for its secretary Svetozar Lastić was elected.

In September AFSH started founding other local organizations in Baranya and Baranya-Bács Slavic Cultural association joined the Front and Martin Laslović was elected as local president.

The first big rally of AFSH was on October 28, 1945, in Mohács. On December 3, 1945, first National conference was held in Mohács and Martin Laslović was elected as president.

Anti-fascist organizations
1945 establishments in Hungary